The Collini Case is a 2019 German drama film directed by Marco Kreuzpaintner. It is based on the eponymous novel by Ferdinand von Schirach.

Cast
Elyas M'Barek as Caspar Leinen
Heiner Lauterbach as Richard Mattinger
Alexandra Maria Lara as Johanna Mayer
Franco Nero as Fabrizio Collini
Rainer Bock as Prosecutor Reimers
Catrin Striebeck as the judge
Manfred Zapatka as old Hans Meyer
Jannis Niewöhner as young Hans Meyer
Pia Stutzenstein as Nina, Caspar's interpreter and eventual secretary
Peter Prager as Bernhard Leinen, Caspar's father

Reception
The site's critical consensus reads, "It stumbles a bit during its arguments, but strong performances and a suspenseful story help The Collini Case earn a winning verdict."

Accolades 
The Collini Case won The Cinema for Peace Award for Justice for 2019.

References

External links

2010s legal drama films
German drama films
Films directed by Marco Kreuzpaintner
Films based on German novels
2019 drama films
2010s German-language films
2010s German films